Football is the most popular sport in Ukraine. The Ukrainian Association of Football (previously Football Federation of Ukraine) is the national governing body and is responsible for overseeing all aspects of the game of football in the country. It was organised in 1991 to replace the Soviet republican-level Football Federation of Ukrainian SSR, created earlier in the 1920s as part of the Soviet system of physical culture councils. The Ukrainian Association of Football is a non-governmental organization and is a member of the National Olympic Committee of Ukraine.

There are several types of football: professional male and female football, amateur male and female football, youth leagues and children's competitions (younger than age of 13), football veterans and beach football, indoor competition and separate competitions for students and military personnel. Ukraine fields a great number of different national teams for various types of international competitions including  continental and world qualifications, Universiades, youth competitions, and international competitions for beach and indoor football.

Summary
The Ukraine national senior team has qualified for the FIFA World Cup once, in 2006, where they reached the quarter-finals led by the former Soviet football star player Oleh Blokhin. The team also qualified on couple of occasions to the continental championship in 2012 and 2016. The Ukraine first junior team made it to the final of the 2006 UEFA European Under-21 Championship. The Ukraine second junior team won the 2009 UEFA European Under-19 Championship and made it to the finals of the FIFA U-20 World Cup. The Ukraine student team won two football tournaments at the Summer Universiade and made it to the finals of another one.

Dynamo Kyiv and Shakhtar Donetsk are among the most recognisable clubs that are from Ukraine. Dynamo Kyiv traces its fame from the Soviet times as they won the European Cup Winners' Cup twice in 1975 and 1986. In 1975 Dynamo extended its success into the UEFA Super Cup as well. In 2009 Shakhtar Donetsk won the UEFA Cup. Among the famous players to come out of Ukraine were Oleh Blokhin and Andriy Shevchenko. The legendary coach Valeri Lobanovski led Dynamo Kyiv to their European Cup victories as well as coaching the former Soviet and later on the Ukraine national football team: He is a Ukrainian football hero.

Ukrainian football professional club competitions are organised in the three-tier league system. Parallel with them there is a knockout competition the Ukrainian Cup. There is also a Super Cup match up that is being conducted on annual basis among the top two best clubs in the country. Several amateur level tournaments are played nationally as well as in every region (oblast); for more information, please see Ukrainian football league system. Female football is less developed, however there is a female national team and a two-tier league system competition for clubs. Among the most successful clubs are Lehenda Chernihiv and Zhytlobud Kharkiv.

Ukraine has also highly developed children's and youth football. There is a national competition conducted by the professional clubs of Ukraine and the best national sports schools. It is a two-tier league with several regional divisions. Each club is represented by four squads with players in age groups ranging from under 14 to under 17. Parallel to that there is an independent Student League which encompasses teams of various universities and institutions of higher education. Selected players from that league successfully compete at student Olympics, the Universiada. The regional amateur football competitions also provide training opportunities for the young soccer stars.

History
Modern Ukrainian club competitions derived mostly from the Soviet competitions.

Divided at Zbruch, the first football competitions in Ukraine appeared in 1900–1910s including the portion of Ukraine that was part of the Russian Empire as well as Austria-Hungary. Competitions were conducted in main cities which were Lemberg (Lviv), Kyiv, Odesa, Kharkiv, and Donbas. Those competitions often involved participations of students or workers either factories or other major employers. In 1912 on initiative of Moscow and Petrograd football enthusiasts of foreign descent in Imperial Russia was constituted "Russian championship among cities" where each city was represented by a collective team. In Imperial Austria on the other hand at around that time started regional competitions at "crownland" level as well as a domestic cup. During the World War I competitions in both empires were suspended for a short period of time. Following the war, political situation has changed in Central Europe as the major European empires fell and were fragmented into many smaller national states. After failing to secure its independence in 1917–1920, Ukraine was torn apart by the Soviet Russia and former Russian province, the restored Poland.

The first recorded national (domestic) competition in Soviet Ukraine started in 1921 and was a competition among city teams (Championship of cities) that represented a participating city (or regional) championship. In Western Ukraine (East Galicia and Volhynia) that was part of Poland, ethnic Ukrainians declared official boycott at organization level and held separate competitions from the official Polish competitions. Later, however, some Ukrainian based clubs joined the "Piłka Nożna" (Polish football) competitions among which was Ukraina Lwów. Soon after the establishment of the Soviet Union in 1924 there was established the Soviet Championship of Cities. Unlike the Imperial Russian competitions, the Soviet competitions involved participation of national (or more correctly republican) teams. The Soviet Championship of Cities existed simultaneously along with republican level championships of cities in each union republic. In interbellum Czechoslovakia which secured control of Carpathian Ruthenia following the World War I, there existed regional competitions of eastern Slovakia and Carpathian Ruthenia and at one point local Rusj Uzgorod qualified for the Czechoslovakian State League.

The organization of the Ukrainian SSR Championship of Cities was organized by the All-Ukrainian Council of Physical Culture which was a republican institution and a branch of the Soviet All-Union Council of Physical Culture. In 1936 in the Soviet Union was organized first football competitions among teams of master or so called "exhibition teams" (pokazatelnye komandy) in four groups that acted as tiers. To the new Soviet competitions were selected several teams from the Ukrainian SSR. The new Soviet reform in football also made some changes to republican competitions. The Ukrainian SSR Championship of Cities was also reformed in 1936 where each city team was competing by representing its sports society, factory, mine, port, collective farm (kolkhoz) thus transforming into so called "Championship of Sports Societies and Departments". This way some Ukrainian teams competed at All-Union level and others at republican, however all Ukrainian teams played at the Ukrainian Cup including those that played at the All-Union competitions such as Dynamo Kyiv and Stakhanovets Stalino.

During World War II, the Soviet Union annexed territories of eastern Poland, and because of that competitions in Poland were disrupted. The previous clubs of the region were dissolved as national bourgeoise clubs and replaced with newly created Soviet "proletarian" clubs such as Spartak or Dynamo. Some former Polish players from the dissolved clubs joined the new Soviet counterparts, while others moved out of the country, were deported or pursued other goals. During the Nazi occupation there was no recorded national football competitions, but there were regional competitions. Czechoslovakia that was previously partitioned by its neighbors had its Carpathian Ruthenia occupied by Hungary and teams from the region joined the Hungarian competitions. Following defeat of the Nazi Germany and its allies, the Soviet Union resumed its domestic competitions including in the newly annexed Carpathian Ruthenia.

With the transformation of the council's (All-Ukrainian Council of Physical Culture) football section into the Football Federation of the Ukrainian SSR in 1959, the Ukrainian championship was integrated into the Soviet championship of Master teams in the Class B starting from 1960, which eventually was transformed into the Soviet Second League. The Championship of Sports Societies and Departments was reorganized into competitions of physical culture collectives, better known as the republican KFK competitions. In 1990 there took another transformation in Soviet football and all republican championships were relegated to the Soviet Second League B or the lower second league, while the Soviet Second League was split into three regional groups instead of previous nine (republican-regional factor). Several former Soviet republics started the process of secession from the Union, such as the Baltic states and Georgia. In 1992 the Soviet championship ended and the 1991–92 Soviet Cup that was planned to be transformed into the CIS Cup was in reality simply an edition of the Russian Cup.

¹ In 1998 KFK competitions were transformed into the Amateur Association.
² From 1993 through 1995 there existed the 3rd League. KFK competitions were grandfathered from the Soviet times.
³ In selected years there existed the supplemental 2nd League.
4 District 1.League and City 1.League
5 District 2.League and City 2.League

Note: Until 1992 the Soviet Tier III was considered as the republican competition for the Ukrainian SSR (see Ukrainian Soviet competitions). In 1992 most of the Ukrainian-based clubs that competed in the top three tiers were reorganised into the Ukrainian Supreme League, while most of the rest non-amateur clubs were organized into the Ukrainian First League.

Football in post Austria-Hungary Empire

Halychyna (1920–1939)

In the western part of Ukraine that was part of Austria-Hungary official football competitions started in 1905 when the first Lemberg city championship took place. After World War I and the fall of the empire, the West Ukraine was annexed by the Second Polish Republic. The Soviet–Ukrainian and Soviet–Polish wars prevented the competition of 1920 from taking place. At the end, only Pogoń was admitted, however, the other clubs entered the competition much later. The teams that were to enter the Polish League were Pogoń Lwów, Czarni Lwów, Polonia Przemyśl, and Rewera Stanisławów. Those are considered to be all-Polish teams consisting mostly of the Polish nationals. Pogoń Lwów was the most successful at the start of the League, winning it four times in a row 1922–1926. The club was coached then by the Austrian manager Karl Fischer. Another club Sparta Lwów made the final of the first Polish Cup competition of 1926. Ukrainian football teams like Ukraina Lwów also existed at that time, but they competed on the amateur level. The Soviet aggression of 1939 disrupted football life in the region and all of the clubs were disbanded. The Soviet administration created its own local football clubs that were part of the Soviet Volunteer Societies.

Bukovina (1922–1940)
Bukovina in the interwar period was part of Romania. There were several clubs all from Chernivtsi that participated in the Romanian football competitions. The most successful club was Dragoş Vodă Cernăuţi. It was all-Romanian club. As in Halychyna the football clubs were ethnically based. Beside the above-mentioned club there were also Jewish clubs Maccabi Cernăuți, FC Hakoah Cernauţi, Polish  Polonia Cernăuţi, and German Jahn Cernăuți. From 1922 to 1932 the clubs from Chernivtsi participated annually in the Romanian championship that was organized by the Olympic-system of elimination. Since the introduction of the regular League in the national competitions those clubs disappeared. Only FC Dragoş Voda Cernauţi participated in the 1937–38 edition of the league, placing last in its group. In 1940 Bukovina became occupied by the Soviet Union and all of the previously established sport organizations were abandoned.

Carpathian Ruthenia (1925–1944)
From 1925 to 1938, this territory was part of Czechoslovakia, and later part of Hungary. The most notable club of the region at that time was SK Rusj Užhorod from Užhorod/Ungvar, later Ungvári Rusznyi. It was the only club that participated in Slovak championship from the region. The club became champion of Slovakia on two occasions: 1933 and 1936. Rusj became known in Europe as the Flying Teachers, because they were the first club that used airplanes to travel to their games. In 1938 the region became part of Hungary. In 1939 there was a tournament among seven teams of that region (Kárpátalja), the winner of which would earn the right to participate on the professional level in the Hungarian competitions. The tournament included four teams from Uzhhorod, including SC Rusj Užhorod, plus each team from Mukacheve, Chop, and Palanky. SC Rusj Užhorod won the tournament, and because of that four teams were allowed to enter the Hungarian competition from the region, two from Uzhhorod Rusj and Ungvári AC, and each from Berehove (Beregszászi FTC) and Mukacheve (Munkács SzE).

Soviet championship prior 1936

Before the establishment of a consistent Soviet football competition in 1936, the Ukrainian SSR had its own football competition from 1921 to 1936. This competition was on a volunteer basis and were not held regularly. These football competitions were a continuation of the imperial football competitions that started at the beginning of the 20th century in the Russian Empire. The winner qualified for the All-Union competition.

The first Ukrainian championship took place in 1921, before the establishment of the Soviet Union. Not much is known of that and the following championships and nothing is known of the competitions between 1924 and 1927. Remarkable is the fact that the dominant team of that period was from Kharkiv which until 1934 was the capital of the Ukrainian SSR.

Soviet championship (1936–1991)

Until the creation of independent competitions, the Ukrainian republican championship had taken place in the Soviet First League after the World War II, the Soviet Second League (since 1963) or in the lower levels of the competition. Three to six of the best Ukrainian clubs competed in the Soviet Top League with Dynamo Kyiv competing in it consistently since its establishment; the Ukrainian champion was considered the team that has won the Ukrainian republican group which was part of the Soviet lower leagues.

Until World War II up to six clubs from Ukraine competed in the Soviet Top League. The nine non-amateur clubs from Ukraine participated in the first season of the Soviet competition: Dynamo Kyiv (I Division); Dynamo Dnipropetrovsk and Dynamo Kharkiv (II Division); Dynamo Odesa, Spartak Kharkiv, Vuhilnyki Staline, Lokomotyv Kyiv (III Division); Traktor Plant Kharkiv, Stal Dnipropetrovsk (IV Division). In 1938 the Soviet Top League was combined into the Super League with 26 clubs playing each other once. Ukraine was represented by six clubs. The following couple of years as the League was reduced only three Ukrainian teams participated in it.

A short time after World War II Ukraine was once again represented only by Dynamo Kyiv. Since 1949 and until 1964 the club was joined by Shakhtar Donetsk and Lokomotyv Kharkiv at the Top Level. In 1956 Lokomotyv was replaced by Avanhard, known today as Metalist. In 1965 Chornomorets Odesa returned to the Soviet Top League and was joined with the SCA Odesa. Since that time Ukraine had four clubs in the League. In 1967 as the Odesa Army team was relegated, Zorya Luhansk emerged and soon thereafter winning the honors. The Luhansk's team was the first club from a provincial city in the Soviet Union that earned the top award. The club success indicated the big football boom in the region. At the start of 1970 Chornomorets Odesa and Shakhtar Donetsk were replaced with Karpaty Lviv and Dnipro Dnipropetrovsk, respectively. By mid-1970s there were again six Ukraine clubs participating. Dynamo Kyiv earned the Cup Winners' Cup and the European Super Cup where in the finals it defeated FC Bayern Munich the captain of which was Franz Beckenbauer. In 1980 the representation of Ukraine was reduced back to five clubs with the classic four: Dynamo Kyiv, Shakhtar Donetsk, Chornomorets Odesa, and Dnipro Dnipropetrovsk. Since 1982, those four were joined by Metalist Kharkiv and stayed at the top level to its dissolution in 1991, coincidentally all five of them represent the five metropoleis of Ukraine with over a million in population. In 1990 Metalurh Zaporizhzhia joined the Soviet Premier League.

Ukrainian teams in the Soviet Top League

1Two points for a win. In 1973, a point for a draw was awarded only to a team that won the subsequent penalty shootout. In 1978–1988, the number of draws for which points were awarded was limited.

Ukrainian teams in the Soviet First League

FC Dynamo Dnipropetrovsk, FC Dynamo Kharkiv, FC Silmash Kharkiv, Sudnobudivnyk Mykolaiv, FC Lokomotyv Kyiv, FC Dnipro Dnipropetrovsk, FC Zorya Luhansk, Spartak Kharkiv, Kharchovyk Odesa, FC Shakhtar Donetsk, FC Lokomotyv Kharkiv, SKA Kyiv, Spartak Lviv, FC Krystal Kherson, FC Hoverla Uzhhorod, FC Metalist Kharkiv, FC Dynamo Luhansk, Bilshovyk Zaporizhia, Lokomotyv Zaporizhia, FC Avanhard Kramatorsk, FC Shakhtar Stakhanov, FC Mukacheve, Spartak Kyiv, Torpedo Kharkiv, Dynamo Chernivtsi, SKA Lviv, Trudovi Rezervy Luhansk, FC Metalurh Zaporizhia, SKCF Sevastopol, FC Spartak Ivano-Frankivsk, Kolos Poltava, SC Prometei Dniprodzerzhynsk, FC Zirka Kirovohrad, FC Dnipro Cherkasy, SC Tavriya Simferopol, FC Nyva Vinnytsia, FC Veres Rivne, FC Lokomotyv Donetsk, SKA Odesa, Temp Kyiv, FC Polissya Zhytomyr, FC Kryvbas Kryvyi Rih, FC Chornomorets Odesa, FC Avanhard Ternopil, FC Shakhtar Horlivka, FC Bukovyna Chernivtsi, FC Volyn Lutsk, Naftovyk Drohobych, FC Desna Chernihiv, FC Podillya Khmelnytskyi, FC Sirius Zhovti Vody, FC Illichivets Mariupol, FC Khimik Sieverodonetsk, FC Frunzenets-Liha-99 Sumy, Trubnyk Nikopol, FC Hirnyk Kryvyi Rih, Shakhtar Oleksandriya, FC Karpaty Lviv, FC Kremin Kremenchuk, FC Elektrometalurh-NZF Nikopol.

Notes:
 In bold are clubs that later also participated in the Ukrainian Premier League. In bold and italic are members of both Soviet and Ukrainian Top leagues.

The first decade (1992–2000)
The independent championship was hastily organized at the start of the spring of 1992 after creation of the Ukrainian Premier League. The League was created out of the six teams that took part in the Soviet Top League, two teams from the Soviet First League, and nine out of eleven out of the Soviet Second League. The other two of that eleven were placed in the Ukrainian Persha Liha as they were to be relegated no matter what. Also the two best teams of the Soviet Second League B of the Ukrainian Zone were placed in the Ukrainian Premier League along with the winner of the 1991 Ukrainian Cup holder that placed ninth in the same group. The 20 participants were split in two groups with winners playing for the champion title and runners-up for the third place. Three teams from each group were to be relegated. As was expected, the five favorites, Dynamo Kyiv, Shakhtar Donetsk, Chornomorets Odesa, Dnipro Dnipropetrovsk, and Metalist Kharkiv placed at the top of each group. In the championship play-off game in Lviv, a sensation took place as the Tavriya Simferopol beat Dynamo Kyiv 1–0. The Creamians earned the first Ukrainian title (thus far the only), losing only once to FC Temp Shepetivka.

After being stunned in the first championship by the tragedy in Lviv, Dynamo Kyiv was anxious to earn its first title on the second go. In the second championship that had a regular League format of 16 teams, the main rival of the Kyivans was Dnipro Dnipropetrovsk which won the first half of the season. By the end of the season both teams were going shoulder to shoulder and at the end they finished with the same number of earned points. The champion title was awarded to Dynamo Kyiv as they had better goal difference. Neither the Golden match or the fact that Dnipro had a better head-to-head record was considered.

The next seven years were known as the total hegemony of Dynamo Kyiv. During this period the Soviet stereotypes changed as some of the best teams were going into a crisis. After the 1993–94 season suddenly Metalist Kharkiv was relegated to the Persha Liha. In the 1995–96 season Shakhtar Donetsk had its worst year in the club's history, placing tenth. Chornomorets Odesa was relegated twice during that first decade after Leonid Buriak left the team. Also couple of newly created teams have emerged, Arsenal Kyiv and Metalurh Donetsk and, in addition, FC Vorskla Poltava has astonished everyone placing the third in the first club's season at the Top Level in 1997.

The decade of Kyiv–Donetsk stand-off (2001–2010)
The next decade was marked by fierce competition between Dynamo Kyiv and Shakhtar Donetsk. Since 2000, Donetsk club proved to be the real challengers to Kyiv's dominance. In 2000 Shakhtar earned their first qualification to the Champions League and their place in the Group stage. Nonetheless, Dynamo is still considered the standard of excellence in the country and the primary feeder to the Ukraine national football team. 2002 became the real cornerstone in the miners history when they earned their first national title under the management of the newly appointed Italian specialist, Nevio Scala, who managed to bring the Donetsk club to its next Ukrainian Cup title as well. Since that time the issue of foreign players became particularly acute and brought series of court cases (see Players section). The FFU and PFL worked together to solve that issue, coming with the plan to force the transitional limitation of the foreign players over the time.

The clubs such as Dnipro and Chornomorets recent contenders for the title had to put up a fierce competition against the newly established contenders Metalurh from Donetsk and Metalist from Kharkiv to qualify for the European competitions. FC Metalist Kharkiv did exceptionally well in the late 2000s, consistently placing right behind Dynamo and Shakhtar. Most remarkable was their participation in the 2009 European season when they had to compete against Dynamo Kyiv to advance to the Quarter-finals of the UEFA Cup 2009. Later the UEFA Cup edition was won for the first time by the Shakhtar Donetsk, the first club of the independent Ukraine.

Latest wins and events 
UEFA Euro 2012 or simply Euro 2012, was the 14th European Championship for men's national football teams organised by UEFA and was co-hosted for the first time by Poland and Ukraine. Poland and Ukraine's bid was chosen by UEFA's executive committee in 2007.

In May 2015, Dnipro Dnipropetrovsk reached their first Europa League final after defeating Napoli 1–0 in Kyiv.

Performance of Ukraine-based professional clubs in Soviet Top League and Ukrainian Premier League

Performance of Ukraine-based professional clubs in Soviet Cup and Ukrainian Cup

Performance of Ukraine-based professional clubs in Soviet Super Cup and Ukrainian Super Cup

National league titles by Region and Championship
The following table lists the Ukraine-based football champions by the Ukrainian regions.

European competitions

UEFA Champions League 

The following teams have qualified for elimination rounds in the UEFA Champions League.

Dynamo Kyiv (1972–73, 1975–76, 1981–82, 1982–83, 1984–85, 1997–98 – Quarter-finals, 1976–77, 1986–87, 1998–99 – Semi-finals)
Dnipro Dnipropetrovsk (1984–85, 1989–90 – Quarter-finals)
Shakhtar Donetsk (2010–11 – Quarter-finals)

UEFA Cup Winners' Cup 

The following teams have qualified for elimination rounds in the UEFA Cup Winners' Cup.

Dynamo Kyiv (1965–66, 1990–91 – Quarter-finals, 1974–75, 1985–86 – Winner)
Shakhtar Donetsk (1983–84 – Quarter-finals)

UEFA Europa League / UEFA Cup 

The following teams have qualified for elimination rounds of the UEFA Cup.

 Shakhtar Donetsk (2008–09 – Winner; 2015–16 – Semi-finals)
 Dnipro Dnipropetrovsk (2014–15 – Finalist)
 Dynamo Kyiv (2008–09 – Semi-finals)

Ukrainian clubs in the Soviet competitions

Ukrainian medalists of the Soviet first tier competitions

All-time table of Ukrainian clubs in the Soviet first tier competitions
List of records of Ukrainian clubs in the Soviet first tier competitions which over the years carried different names, only since 1971 they were known as the Soviet Top League which was established in place of the Class A Top Group (First Group).

Ukrainian medalists of the Soviet second tier competitions

All-time table of Ukrainian clubs in the Soviet second tier competitions
List of records of Ukrainian clubs in the Soviet second tier competitions which over the years carried different names, only since 1970 they were known as the Soviet First League which was established in place of the Class A First Group (Second Group).

Ukrainian medalists of the Soviet third tier competitions

All-time table of Ukrainian clubs in the Soviet third tier competitions
List of records of Ukrainian clubs in the Soviet third tier competitions which over the years carried different names, only since 1970 they were known as the Soviet Second League which was established in place of the Class A Second Group.

Ukrainian medalists of the Soviet fourth and lower tiers competitions

All-time table of Ukrainian clubs in the Soviet fourth and lower tiers competitions
List of records of Ukrainian clubs in the Soviet fourth and lower tiers competitions which over the years carried different names, only since 1970 they were known as the Soviet Second League B. In 1937 there also existed fifth tier.

In 1937 three more clubs from Ukraine competed in the 5th tier: Lokomotyv Dnipropetrovsk, Sudnobudivnyk Mykolaiv, and Spartak Kyiv.

Awards

Other 2010 awards (ua-football.com readers)
Second symbolic team: Maksym Koval – Vitaliy Denisov, Milan Obradovic, Papa Gueye, Artem Fedetsky – Willian, Fernandinho, Oleksandr Aliyev, Denys Oliynyk – Taison, Artem Milevskyi – Coach: Myron Markevych
 Discovery of the season – Karpaty Lviv
 Best rookie – Yaroslav Rakytsky
 Best legionnaire – Darijo Srna
 Best Ukrainian player – Ihor Khudobyak
 Team of the season – Ukraine U-21

See also

 Football in Crimea
 Ukraine national football team
 List of football stadiums in Ukraine

References

External links
 Soviet Championships prior to 1936 

 

lt:Ukrainos futbolo sistema